Gabriel-Marie-Théodore-Joseph, comte d'Hédouville (27 July 1755 in Laon, Aisne – 30 March 1825) (also Thomas Hedouville) was a French soldier and diplomat.

Life

Early life
A student at the royal collège at La Flèche, he became a lieutenant in 1788 and rose to adjutant-general and lieutenant-colonel in 1792.  He fought at the Battle of Valmy on 20 September 1792 and was made general de brigade and chief of staff to the Army of Moselle the following March.  He then distinguished himself at the Battle of Kaiserslautern.  However, he was then suspended and imprisoned as a noble and thus as a suspect, but was freed on 9 Thermidor year II (27 July 1794), brought back into the army at the rank of general of brigade and sent to the Army of the Coasts of Cherbourg (then at Brest).  He became general of division in November 1795 and the Cherbourg army's chief of staff in January 1795, under Lazare Hoche.  Under Hoche's orders he carried out a policy of pacification and appeasement in the west, which had revolted against the Republican regime.

He temporarily commanded the Army of the Coasts of the Ocean in place of Hoche from 10 July to mid-August 1796.

Saint-Domingue
He served on Saint-Domingue in 1798, where he had been sent as governor during Sonthonax's second commission. He encouraged the dissension between André Rigaud and Toussaint Louverture which helped to fuel the Haitian Revolution.
Toussaint's military leadership during the Haitian Revolution resulted in the rebellious slaves gaining the upper hand and restoring most of Saint-Domingue to France. Now that he ruled the island, Toussaint did not wish to surrender power to France and continued to effectively rule the country autonomously. Hédouville was one of the rivals to power whom Toussaint had to overcome. Hédouville was eventually forced to flee. However, before he left, he released André Rigaud from Toussaint's leadership.

Consulate to Restoration
After his time on Saint-Domingue, Hédouville was employed by the Armée d'Angleterre before returning to western France in January 1800 to take over from Hoche as commander-in-chief of the Army of the West He again negotiated a peace settlement with the Royalists. He was appointed as the Consulate's minister plenipotentiary at Saint Petersburg, Russia, from 1801 to 1804, when the Tsar broke relations with France. Hédouville left Saint Petersburg 7 June 1804. On 1 February 1805 he became a member of the Sénat conservateur, and he was ennobled as a Count of the Empire. Remaining a monarchist at heart, he enthusiastically rallied to King Louis XVIII in 1814.

Notes

References

External links
Hédouville Flees

1755 births
1825 deaths
People from Laon
People of the Haitian Revolution
French generals
Military leaders of the French Revolutionary Wars
French Republican military leaders of the French Revolutionary Wars
Members of the Sénat conservateur
Counts of France
19th-century French diplomats
Names inscribed under the Arc de Triomphe
Ambassadors of France to the Russian Empire